The Expedition to the West Coast of Borneo was a punitive expedition of the Royal Netherlands East Indies Army against the Chinese Indonesian independence republic at Pontianak, Mandor and Monterado in 1823.

Sources
1900. W.A. Terwogt. Het land van Jan Pieterszoon Coen. Geschiedenis van de Nederlanders in oost-Indië. P. Geerts. Hoorn
1900. G. Kepper. Wapenfeiten van het Nederlands Indische Leger; 1816–1900. M.M. Cuvee, Den Haag.'
1876. A.J.A. Gerlach. Nederlandse heldenfeiten in Oost Indë. Drie delen. Gebroeders Belinfante, Den Haag.

Conflicts in 1823
Dutch conquest of Indonesia
Pontianak